Teucrium corymbosum, commonly known as forest germander, is a species of flowering plant in the family Lamiaceae and is native to Australia and New Guinea. It is a perennial herb or subshrub densely covered with glands and with narrow egg-shaped leaves usually with toothed edges, and groups of mostly up to ten white flowers.

Description
Its stems are square in cross-section and densely covered with greyish hairs and sessile glands. The edges of the leaves are toothed, (except in the Warrumbungles form) and the lower surface is hairy.

Taxonomy
Teucrium corymbosum was formally described in 1810 by botanist Robert Brown in Prodromus Florae Novae Hollandiae.

Distribution and habitat
Forest germander grows in forest, dry creek beds, shaded and partially cleared areas, often on rocky ground. It occurs in New Guinea, Queensland, eastern New South Wales, Victoria and Tasmania, and in south-eastern South Australia.

Conservation status
The species is listed as rare in Tasmania under the Threatened Species Protection Act 1995.

References

corymbosum
Lamiales of Australia
Flora of New Guinea
Plants described in 1810
Taxa named by Robert Brown (botanist, born 1773)
Flora of Queensland
Flora of New South Wales
Flora of Victoria (Australia)
Flora of South Australia
Flora of Tasmania